Foster Street is a hamlet in the North Weald Bassett civil parish of the Epping Forest district in the English county of Essex.
A non-conformist burying ground was established in 1677 by William Woodward, for the congregation that he was the leader of in the Harlow area. Among the burials are the radical editor Benjamin Flower, his wife Eliza, and their two daughters, the composer Eliza Flower and the poet Sarah Fuller Adams. The burial ground remained in use until 1979.

Nearby settlements 
Nearby settlements include the town of Harlow and the area of Church Langley and the hamlets of Hastingwood, Threshers Bush and Hobbs Cross.

Transport 
For transport there is the M11 motorway and the A414 road nearby.

References 
 A-Z Essex (page 55)

Hamlets in Essex
North Weald Bassett